The Paxman Ventura is  a diesel engine for railway locomotives, built by Davey, Paxman & Co.

The type YJ or Ventura was developed in the mid-1950s as Davey, Paxman's first high-speed diesel engine. With a view to the forthcoming modernisation and dieselisation of British Railways, it was intended as a successor to Paxman's existing medium-speed engine, the direct injection YH. High-speed engines offered higher power-to-weight ratios, which in turn allowed locomotives to have a lower axle loading and greater route availability. The YJ was to have a weight of less than four tons for a 1,200 hp V12, with versions of 8-, 12- and 16-cylinders. Their construction and reliable use though required more sophisticated manufacture than previously, with better metallurgy and balancing of the moving parts for faster running and a stiffer crankcase to avoid vibration.

Description 
Like its medium-speed predecessor the Paxman YH, the Ventura is a 60° V engine with 6, 8, 12 or 16 cylinders. The engines are similar in many details and broadly similar in capacity and power; their main differences are in their operating speed, the improvements necessary to achieve this, and the Ventura's resulting lighter weight.

The crankcase / cylinder block for MOD Vessels were fabricated from steel by welding a mixture of steel castings and platework This gives a more rigid structure than the YH's cast light alloy block. The aluminium frame of the YH and ZH engines had previously given trouble with cracking and had to be replaced in the Class 17 with a cast iron frame, at Paxman's expense. Both engines have individual aluminium cylinder heads for each cylinder.. All other applications had cast iron crankcase / cylinder block.  Centrifugally cast iron wet cylinder liners are used with aluminium pistons in both. These pistons have three compression rings and two oil-control rings. The top ring is carried in a cast iron insert. The combustion chamber of this direct injection engine is a toroidal recess in the piston crown.

The YJ engines were primarily developed for diesel electric locomotives (however Paxmans main design philosophy was maximum power for a given size and weight) and so their crankshafts have the unusual feature of an additional main bearing at the drive end, to help support the weight of the generator armature, where a single-bearing generator can be otherwise unsupported at one end.

Fork and blade connecting rods are used, with the inner rod running on the outside of a shared bearing sleeve.

There are four valves per cylinder, driven by pushrods and rockers from a single camshaft between the cylinder banks. The fuel injector is centrally mounted between the valves, and is supplied by a pair of inline fuel injection pumps, one per bank.

The single turbocharger is carried above the engine, with its axis longitudinal.

Smaller, single bank six- and eight-cylinder engines, the 6YJ and 8YJ, were derived from the V engine.

Paxman licensed the Ventura design to ALCO, with a reciprocal agreement also permitting Paxman to build the popular ALCO 251. As an indication of the high power / weight ratio of the Ventura, this was around three times that of the 251.

Use 
 12YJ
 Class 29, re-engining of the licence-built MAN engines in the NBL Type 2 (Class 21) diesel-electrics.
 Class 42, two units fitted from new to D830 Majestic for comparison trials. Units rated at 1200 BHp and allied to normal Class 42 spec Mekydro transmissions.

 6YJ
 Class 14
 Class 74

 16YJ
 Ceylon Government Railways, 15 supplied (14 locos, +1 spare) 1,580 hp
 Hungarian State Railways, single engine supplied for trials 1,870 hp
 Type 42 destroyer, as a set of four generator sets, each rated at 1 MW.
 Type 22 frigate Batch 1 and 2, as a set of four generator sets, each rated at 1 MW.

References 

Diesel locomotive engines
Diesel engines by model
Ventura
V12 engines
V16 engines